A regenerative circuit is an amplifier circuit that employs positive feedback (also known as regeneration or reaction). Some of the output of the amplifying device is applied back to its input so as to add to the input signal, increasing the amplification. One example is the Schmitt trigger (which is also known as a regenerative comparator), but the most common use of the term is in RF amplifiers, and especially regenerative receivers, to greatly increase the gain of a single amplifier stage.

The regenerative receiver was invented in 1912 and patented in 1914 by American electrical engineer Edwin Armstrong when he was an undergraduate at Columbia University. It was widely used between 1915 and World War II. Advantages of regenerative receivers include increased sensitivity with modest hardware requirements, and increased selectivity because the Q of the tuned circuit will be increased when the amplifying vacuum tube or transistor has its feedback loop around the tuned circuit (via a "tickler" winding or a tapping on the coil) because it introduces some negative resistance.

Due partly to its tendency to radiate interference when oscillating, by the 1930s the regenerative receiver was largely superseded by other TRF receiver designs (for example "reflex" receivers) and especially by another Armstrong invention - superheterodyne receivers and is largely considered obsolete. Regeneration (now called positive feedback) is still widely used in other areas of electronics, such as in oscillators, active filters, and bootstrapped amplifiers.

A receiver circuit that used larger amounts of regeneration in a more complicated way to achieve even higher amplification, the  superregenerative receiver, was also invented by Armstrong in 1922. It was never widely used in general commercial receivers, but due to its small parts count it was used in specialized applications. One widespread use during WWII was IFF transceivers, where single tuned circuit completed the entire electronics system. It is still used in a few specialized low data rate applications, such as garage door openers, wireless networking devices, walkie-talkies and toys.

Regenerative receiver

The gain of any amplifying device, such as a vacuum tube, transistor, or op amp, can be increased by feeding some of the energy from its output back into its input in phase with the original input signal. This is called positive feedback or regeneration.  Because of the large amplification possible with regeneration, regenerative receivers often use only a single amplifying element (tube or transistor). In a regenerative receiver the output of the tube or transistor is connected back to its own input through a tuned circuit (LC circuit).  The tuned circuit allows positive feedback only at its resonant frequency. In regenerative receivers using only one active device, the same tuned circuit is coupled to the antenna and also serves to select the radio frequency to be received, usually by means of variable capacitance. In the regenerative circuit discussed here, the active device also functions as a detector; this circuit is also known as a regenerative detector. A regeneration control is usually provided for adjusting the amount of feedback (the loop gain). It is desirable for the circuit design to provide regeneration control that can gradually increase feedback to the point of oscillation and that provides control of the oscillation from small to larger amplitude and back to no oscillation without jumps of amplitude or hysteresis in control.

Two important attributes of a radio receiver are sensitivity and selectivity. The regenerative detector provides sensitivity and selectivity due to voltage amplification and the characteristics of a resonant circuit consisting of inductance and capacitance. As  becomes smaller the amplification increases. The  of the tuned circuit (L2 C2) without regeneration is  where  is the reactance of the coil and  represents the total dissipative loss of the tuned circuit. Oscillation begins when .

Regeneration can increase the detection gain of a detector by a factor of 1,700 or more. This is quite an improvement, especially for the low-gain vacuum tubes of the 1920s and early 1930s.  The type 36 screen-grid tube (obsolete since the mid-1930s) had a non-regenerative detection gain (audio frequency plate voltage divided by radio frequency input voltage) of only 9.2 at 7.2 MHz, but in a regenerative detector, had detection gain as high as 7,900 at critical regeneration (non-oscillating) and as high as 15,800 with regeneration just above critical. The "... non-oscillating regenerative amplification is limited by the stability of the circuit elements, tube [or device] characteristics and [stability of] supply voltages which determine the maximum value of regeneration obtainable without self-oscillation".  Intrinsically, there is little or no difference in the gain and stability available from vacuum tubes, JFETs, MOSFETs or bipolar junction transistors (BJTs).

A major improvement in stability and a small improvement in available gain for reception of CW radiotelegraphy is provided by the use of a separate oscillator, known as a heterodyne oscillator or beat oscillator. Providing the oscillation separately from the detector allows the regenerative detector to be set for maximum gain and selectivity - which is always in the non-oscillating condition. Interaction between the detector and the beat oscillator can be minimized by operating the beat oscillator at half of the receiver operating frequency, using the second harmonic of the beat oscillator in the detector.

AM reception
For AM reception, the gain of the loop is adjusted so it is just below the level required for oscillation (a loop gain of just less than one).  The result of this is to greatly increase the gain of the amplifier at the bandpass frequency (resonant frequency), while not increasing it at other frequencies.   So the incoming radio signal is amplified by a large factor, 103 - 105, increasing the receiver's sensitivity to weak signals.  The high gain also has the effect of reducing the circuit's bandwidth (increasing the Q) by an equal factor, increasing the selectivity of the receiver.

CW reception (autodyne mode)

For the reception of CW radiotelegraphy (Morse code), the feedback is increased just to the point of oscillation. The tuned circuit is adjusted to provide typically 400 to 1000 Hertz difference between the receiver oscillation frequency and the desired transmitting station's signal frequency. The two frequencies beat in the nonlinear amplifier, generating heterodyne or beat frequencies. The difference frequency, typically 400 to 1000 Hertz, is in the audio range; so it is heard as a tone in the receiver's speaker whenever the station's signal is present.

Demodulation of a signal in this manner, by use of a single amplifying device as oscillator and mixer simultaneously, is known as autodyne reception. The term autodyne predates multigrid tubes and is not applied to use of tubes specifically designed for frequency conversion.

SSB reception
For the reception of single-sideband (SSB) signals, the circuit is also adjusted to oscillate as in CW reception. The tuning is adjusted until the demodulated voice is intelligible.

Advantages and disadvantages 
Regenerative receivers require fewer components than other types of receiver circuit, such as the TRF and superheterodyne.  The circuit's advantage was that it got much more amplification (gain) out of the expensive vacuum tubes, thus reducing the number of tubes required and therefore the cost of a receiver.  Early vacuum tubes had low gain and tended to oscillate at radio frequencies (RF). TRF receivers often required 5 or 6 tubes; each stage requiring tuning and neutralization, making the receiver cumbersome, power hungry, and hard to adjust.  A regenerative receiver, by contrast, could often provide adequate reception with the use of only one tube.  In the 1930s the regenerative receiver was replaced by the superheterodyne circuit in commercial receivers due to the superheterodyne's superior performance and the falling cost of tubes.  Since the advent of the transistor in 1946, the low cost of active devices has removed most of the advantage of the circuit.  However, in recent years the regenerative circuit has seen a modest comeback in receivers for low cost digital radio applications such as garage door openers, keyless locks, RFID readers and some cell phone receivers.

A disadvantage of this receiver, especially in designs that couple the detector tuned circuit to the antenna, is that the regeneration (feedback) level must be adjusted when the receiver is tuned to a different frequency. The antenna impedance varies with frequency, changing the loading of the input tuned circuit by the antenna, requiring the regeneration to be adjusted. In addition, the Q of the detector tuned circuit components vary with frequency, requiring adjustment of the regeneration control.

A disadvantage of the single active device regenerative detector in autodyne operation is that the local oscillation causes the operating point to move significantly away from the ideal operating point, resulting in the detection gain being reduced.

Another drawback is that when the circuit is adjusted to oscillate it can radiate a signal from its antenna, so it can cause interference to other nearby receivers. Adding an RF amplifier stage between the antenna and the regenerative detector can reduce unwanted radiation, but would add expense and complexity.

Other shortcomings of regenerative receivers are the sensitive and unstable tuning. These problems have the same cause: a regenerative receiver's gain is greatest when it operates on the verge of oscillation, and in that condition, the circuit behaves chaotically. Simple regenerative receivers electrically couple the antenna to the detector tuned circuit, resulting in the electrical characteristics of the antenna influencing the resonant frequency of the detector tuned circuit. Any movement of the antenna or large objects near the antenna can change the tuning of the detector.

History
The inventor of FM radio, Edwin Armstrong, invented and patented the regenerative circuit while he was a junior in college, in 1914. He patented the superregenerative circuit in 1922, and the superheterodyne receiver in 1918.

Lee De Forest filed a patent in 1916 that became the cause of a contentious lawsuit with the prolific inventor Armstrong, whose patent for the regenerative circuit had been issued in 1914. The lawsuit lasted twelve years, winding its way through the appeals process and ending up at the Supreme Court. Armstrong won the first case, lost the second, stalemated at the third, and then lost the final round at the Supreme Court.

At the time the regenerative receiver was introduced, vacuum tubes were expensive and consumed much power, with the added expense and encumbrance of heavy batteries. So this design, getting most gain out of one tube, filled the needs of the growing radio community and immediately thrived. Although the superheterodyne receiver is the most common receiver in use today, the regenerative radio made the most out of very few parts.

In World War II the regenerative circuit was used in some military equipment. An example is the German field radio "Torn.E.b". Regenerative receivers needed far fewer tubes and less power consumption for nearly equivalent performance.

A related circuit, the superregenerative detector, found several highly important military uses in World War II in  Friend or Foe identification equipment and in the top-secret proximity fuze. An example here is the miniature RK61 thyratron marketed in 1938, which was designed specifically to operate like a vacuum triode below its ignition voltage, allowing it to amplify analog signals as a self-quenching superregenerative detector in radio control receivers, and was the major technical development which led to the wartime development of radio-controlled weapons and the parallel development of radio controlled modelling as a hobby.

In the 1930s, the superheterodyne design began to gradually supplant the regenerative receiver, as tubes became far less expensive. In Germany the design was still used in the millions of mass-produced German "peoples receivers" (Volksempfänger) and "German small receivers" (DKE, Deutscher Kleinempfänger). Even after WWII, the regenerative design was still present in early after-war German minimal designs along the lines of the "peoples receivers" and "small receivers", dictated by lack of materials. Frequently German military tubes like the "RV12P2000" were employed in such designs. There were even superheterodyne designs, which used the regenerative receiver as a combined IF and demodulator with fixed regeneration. The superregenerative design was also present in early FM broadcast receivers around 1950. Later it was almost completely phased out of mass production, remaining only in hobby kits, and some special applications, like gate openers.

Superregenerative receiver

The superregenerative receiver uses a second lower-frequency oscillation (within the same stage or by using a second oscillator stage) to provide single-device circuit gains of around one million. This second oscillation periodically interrupts or "quenches" the main RF oscillation.  Ultrasonic quench rates between 30 and 100 kHz are typical. After each quenching, RF oscillation grows exponentially, starting from the tiny energy picked up by the antenna plus circuit noise. The amplitude reached at the end of the quench cycle (linear mode) or the time taken to reach limiting amplitude (log mode) depends on the strength of the received signal from which exponential growth started.  A low-pass filter in the audio amplifier filters the quench and RF frequencies from the output, leaving the AM modulation. This provides a crude but very effective automatic gain control (AGC).

Advantages and applications
Superregenerative detectors work well for AM and can also be used for wide-band signals such as FM, where they perform "slope detection". Regenerative detectors work well for narrow-band signals, especially for CW and SSB which need a heterodyne oscillator or BFO. A superregenerative detector does not have a usable heterodyne oscillator – even though the superregen always self-oscillates, so CW (Morse code)and SSB (single side band) signals can't be received properly.

Superregeneration is most valuable above 27 MHz, and for signals where broad tuning is desirable.  The superregen uses many fewer components for nearly the same sensitivity as more complex designs. It is easily possible to build superregen receivers which operate at microwatt power levels, in the 30 to 6,000 MHz range. It removes the need for the operator to manually adjust regeneration level to just below the point of oscillation - the circuit automatically is taken out of oscillation periodically, but with the disadvantage that small amounts of interference may be a problem for others. These are ideal for remote-sensing applications or where long battery life is important. For many years, superregenerative circuits have been used for commercial products such as garage-door openers, radar detectors, microwatt RF data links, and very low cost walkie-talkies.

Because the superregenerative detectors tend to receive the strongest signal and ignore other signals in the nearby spectrum, the superregen works best with bands that are relatively free of interfering signals. Due to Nyquist's theorem, its quenching frequency must be at least twice the signal bandwidth. But quenching with overtones acts further as a heterodyne receiver mixing additional unneeded signals from those bands into the working frequency. Thus the overall bandwidth of superregenerator cannot be less than 4 times that of the quench frequency, assuming the quenching oscillator produces an ideal sine wave.

Patents

 1940.

See also
Tuned electrical circuit
Q multiplier

References

 
. History of radio in 1925. Has May 5, 1924, appellate decision by Josiah Alexander Van Orsdel in De Forest v Armstrong, pp 46–55. Appellate court credited De Forest with the regenerative circuit: "The decisions of the Commissioner are reversed and priority awarded to De Forest." p 55.

  Ulrich L. Rohde, Ajay Poddar www.researchgate.net/publication/4317999_A_Unifying_Theory_and_Characterization_of_Super-Regenerative_Receiver_(SRR)

External links

Some Recent Developments in the Audion Receiver by EH Armstrong, Proceedings of the IRE (Institute of Radio Engineers), volume 3, 1915, pp. 215–247.
a one transistor regenerative receiver
Armstrong v. De Forest Radio Telephone & Telegraph Co. (2nd Cir. 1926) 10 F.2d 727, February 8, 1926; cert denied 270 U.S. 663, 46 S.Ct. 471. opinion on leagle.com
Armstrong v. De Forest, 13 F.2d 438 (2d Cir. 1926)

Radio electronics
Electronic circuits
History of radio
Receiver (radio)